CityLink Brown (BR) is a bus route operated by the Maryland Transit Administration between Downtown Baltimore City, and Overlea, Baltimore County, or White Marsh, Baltimore County. Northbound trips on the route depart from University of Maryland Medical Center, at the intersection of South Greene Street and West Pratt Street in Downtown Baltimore, and terminate at either the intersection of Belair Road and East Overlea Avenue just outside the eastern Baltimore City boundary, or at the White Marsh Mall Park & Ride. The northern terminal stop alternates throughout the day, and late night service only runs to Overlea. Southbound trips run between the same terminal stops in reverse; likewise, they depart either from White Marsh or Overlea.

References

Maryland Transit Administration bus routes